Abbasi Shaheed Hospital is a teaching hospital located in Paposh Nagar neighborhood of Nazimabad, Karachi, Sindh, Pakistan.

History
The hospital was constructed in the early 1970s and serves the residents of northern part of the city (Nazimabad, North Nazimabad, North Karachi, F. B. Area, Orangi Town etc.) with an estimated population of nearly 1 million. It is the Karachi's 3rd largest government hospital after Jinnah Postgraduate Medical Centre (JPMC) and Civil Hospital.

This hospital was constructed by the city government during the tenure of Prime minister Zulfikar Ali Bhutto, in the name of Major Ziauddin Abbasi who sacrificed his life in the 1965 war between Pakistan and India.

See also
 List of hospitals in Karachi
 List of hospitals in Pakistan

References

External links

Hospital buildings completed in 1974
Teaching hospitals in Pakistan
Hospitals in Karachi
Hospitals established in 1974